Pouteria penicillata is a species of plant in the family Sapotaceae. It is endemic to Guyana.

References

Flora of Guyana
penicillata
Vulnerable plants
Endemic flora of Guyana
Taxonomy articles created by Polbot
Taxa named by Charles Baehni